Ago Pajur (born 24 March 1962 in Türi) is an Estonian historian. His principal fields of interest are the political history of Estonia in the first half of the 20th century, and the military history of Estonia in the 20th century.

In 1999, he defended his doctoral thesis at the University of Tartu.

Since 1991, he is teaching history of Estonia at Tartu University.

In 2020, he was awarded with Order of the White Star, V class.

References

Living people
1962 births
20th-century Estonian historians
University of Tartu alumni
Academic staff of the University of Tartu
Recipients of the Order of the White Star, 5th Class
People from Türi
21st-century Estonian historians